Dolaze nam bolji dani is the ninth studio album by Serbian singer Dragana Mirković. It was released in 1992.

Track listing
Dobro jutro, dobar dan
Umirem majko
Pitaju me u mom kraju
Sedmi dan
Žensko srce
Matematika
Ima li leta il' zime
Da, da, da
Dve sudbine
Stani dušo, stani zlato
Dolaze nam bolji dani
Moralo je leto proći
O, da li znaš

References

1992 albums
Dragana Mirković albums